Eagle House School is a coeducational preparatory school near Sandhurst in Berkshire, England. Founded in 1820, it is one of the country's oldest preparatory schools.

History
Eagle House was founded in 1820 at Brook Green, Hammersmith. In 1860 it moved to a house named Brackenbury's at Wimbledon, then in 1886, after a major fire, moved to its present home at Sandhurst. In 1930 a severe outbreak of chicken-pox and measles reduced the school's numbers from twenty-nine to five, but the school soon recovered. The school was purchased by Wellington College in 1968 and shares most of its governors.

Between 1957 and 1962 Nick Drake, later a singer-songwriter, attended the school and became head boy. He was taught French at the school by John Watson, who while still at Eagle House came second in the Eurovision Song Contest 1960 with his song "Looking High, High, High".

Lieutenant-General Sir John Cowley chaired the school's Governing Body from 1968 to 1976.

Present day
Originally for boys only, Eagle House now caters for boys and girls between the ages of two and thirteen. It is in the same ownership as Wellington College, forming part of the same registered charitable organization. A majority of pupils continue their secondary education at the College. Before the College became fully coeducational in 2005, most girls left at age 11 for secondary school.

The school releases its own publication titled "The Eagle" regularly which is available to pupils and parents in hard copies, paper-back copies, and also on the school's website.

Headmasters
1858: Edward Huntingford
1882: Arthur Malan
2020: Andrew Barnard*

Notable former pupils

 Field Marshal Sir Claude John Eyre Auchinleck, soldier
 Stuart Burge, actor and director
 James Chalmers, actor
 Nick Drake, singer-songwriter
John Gardner, composer
 Lewis Moody, rugby player
 John Bruce Lockhart, schoolmaster and cricketer
 Earl of Wessex, son of The Duke of Edinburgh and grandson of Queen Elizabeth II

Further reading
Daniel Jones, ": , " [Phonetics in English Schools: Eagle House School, Sandhurst], in Le Maître phonétique (1911) Page 3.

References

External links 
School Website
Profile on the ISC website
Profile on the Good Schools Guide

Preparatory schools in Berkshire
Educational institutions established in 1820
Private schools in Bracknell Forest
Boarding schools in Berkshire
Sandhurst, Berkshire